The Sylvanus Marriage Octagonal Barn near New Rockford, North Dakota, United States, was built in 1902.  It meets the current, practical definition for a round barn.  It was listed on the National Register of Historic Places in 1986.

References

Barns on the National Register of Historic Places in North Dakota
Infrastructure completed in 1902
Round barns in North Dakota
National Register of Historic Places in Eddy County, North Dakota
Octagon barns in the United States
1902 establishments in North Dakota